FNL Network (Fashion News Lifestyle Network) is an American television network founded by Rocco Leo Gaglioti in 2015 and based in Los Angeles, California. It is available on a variety of devices including Amazon Fire TV, Apple TV, Roku, and all Android and Apple iOS devices. Its signature program, Fashion News Live, goes backstage at all the major fashion weeks around the globe. Past co-hosts include Brana Dane and Carmen Carerra.

Programming
FNL Network offers a combination of fashion, film, travel, beauty, health and reality TV.

List of original programs
 A Shaded View on Fashion Film
 Beauty Tips
 Carol Alt's Living Room
 City Showcase
 Courtney
 Entertainment and Fashion Clips
 Fashion News Live
 FNL Vintage
 Film Corner
 Flashback Friday
 International Digital Fashion Week (IDFW)
 Behind the Scenes of Fashion News Live
 IndestruXtable
 Inside Amato
 Fashion News Live in ASL
 Miss and Mister Deaf International
 Model Diaries
 Model Monday
 Street Style
 The Bird's Eye View
 Ask Rocco
 The Wishwall
 13th A Shaded View on Fashion Film (ASVOFF)

References

External links
 

English-language television stations in the United States
Television networks in the United States
Television channels and stations established in 2015